Legislative Assembly elections were held in February 1990, to elect representatives for the Bihar Legislative Assembly. It resulted in a decisive victory for the Janta Dal, riding on the pan-India victory of 1989, during V. P. Singh's wave. Political manoeuvres ensured parliamentarian Lalu Prasad Yadav's victory in the chief minister-ship battle, against seasoned Bihar leader Ram Sundar Das, who was close to Janta party stalwarts like S.N. Sinha and Chandrashekhar.

Results

Source:

Elected members

References

1990
1990
Bihar